Briggs is an unincorporated community and census-designated place (CDP) in Cherokee County, Oklahoma, United States. The population was 303 at the 2010 census.

History
The community is said to have been named for John Briggs, a local merchant.

Geography
Briggs is located east of the center of Cherokee County at  (35.925022, -94.910749). It lies east of Tahlequah, the county seat, along U.S. Route 62. The Illinois River, a tributary of the Arkansas River, forms the northern and western edge of the community. Briggs is bordered to the south by Park Hill and to the north by Sparrowhawk.

Demographics

As of the census of 2000, there were 358 people, 129 households, and 95 families residing in the CDP. The population density was 90.5 people per square mile (34.9/km2). There were 139 housing units at an average density of 35.1/sq mi (13.6/km2). The racial makeup of the CDP was 45.53% White, 38.27% Native American, 5.31% from other races, and 10.89% from two or more races. Hispanic or Latino of any race were 8.10% of the population.

There were 129 households, out of which 34.9% had children under the age of 18 living with them, 56.6% were married couples living together, 13.2% had a female householder with no husband present, and 25.6% were non-families. 20.2% of all households were made up of individuals, and 2.3% had someone living alone who was 65 years of age or older. The average household size was 2.78 and the average family size was 3.17.

In the CDP, the population was spread out, with 29.1% under the age of 18, 7.8% from 18 to 24, 32.1% from 25 to 44, 22.6% from 45 to 64, and 8.4% who were 65 years of age or older. The median age was 32 years. For every 100 females, there were 109.4 males. For every 100 females age 18 and over, there were 104.8 males.

The median income for a household in the CDP was $31,250, and the median income for a family was $30,781. Males had a median income of $21,875 versus $35,500 for females. The per capita income for the CDP was $14,340. About 11.9% of families and 13.8% of the population were below the poverty line, including none of those under age 18 and 40.0% of those age 65 or over.

Education
The Briggs Elementary School supports students through the eighth grade.

References

Further reading
 Shirk, George H.; Oklahoma Place Names; University of Oklahoma Press; Norman, Oklahoma; 1987: .

Census-designated places in Cherokee County, Oklahoma
Census-designated places in Oklahoma